Sven-Erik Bucht (born 28 December 1954) is a Swedish politician of the Social Democrats. He served as Minister for Rural Affairs in the Löfven cabinet from 2014 to 2019.

Bucht served municipal commissioner in Haparanda from 2003 to 2010. During this time an IKEA shop was established in Haparanda.

In 2010, he was elected to the Riksdag.

References

External links

1954 births
Living people
People from Haparanda Municipality
Government ministers of Sweden
Members of the Riksdag 2010–2014
Members of the Riksdag 2014–2018
Members of the Riksdag 2018–2022
Members of the Riksdag from the Social Democrats